Edmund "Ed" Sherod (born September 13, 1959) is an American former professional basketball player.

A 6'2" guard born in Richmond, Virginia, Sherod attended Virginia Commonwealth University from 1977 to 1981.  There, he tallied a then-school record 582 assists and participated in two NCAA men's basketball tournaments. He made NBA history by becoming the first-ever player to make his debut in the postseason, in Game 1 with New Jersey against Washington in the 1981 Eastern Conference First Round. Sherod then played one season (1982–83) in the National Basketball Association as a member of the New York Knicks, averaging 6.2 points per game and 4.9 assists per game.

From 1989 to 1990, he served as head coach for VCU's women's basketball team.

External links
NBA career statistics
VCU Rams All-Time Team profile

1959 births
Living people
Basketball coaches from Virginia
Basketball players from Richmond, Virginia
Lancaster Lightning players
New Jersey Nets draft picks
New York Knicks players
VCU Rams men's basketball players
American men's basketball players
Guards (basketball)
VCU Rams women's basketball coaches